Pessano con Bornago is a comune (municipality) in the Metropolitan City of Milan in the Italian region Lombardy, located about  northeast of Milan, in an area called Martesana.

Pessano con Bornago borders the following municipalities: Cambiago, Caponago, Gessate, Carugate, Gorgonzola, Bussero.

References

External links
 Official website

Cities and towns in Lombardy